Carl Brewer may refer to:
 Carl Brewer (ice hockey) (1938–2001), Canadian ice hockey defenceman
 Carl Brewer (politician) (1957–2020), former mayor of Wichita, Kansas